Lori Mattix (born November 29, 1958), sometimes known as Lori Maddox or Lori Lightning, is an American former child model and  "baby" groupie of the 1970s. , she is a partner and buyer for the Glam Boutique in West Hollywood. She is perhaps best known for an interview with Thrillist in 2015 in which she made allegations of being involved in sexual relationships with David Bowie, Jimmy Page, and Mick Jagger; these are relationships which would have occurred while she was underage and while the musicians were in their twenties, although her connections to Bowie and Jagger are disputed. 

Her experience has been discussed in the Me Too movement, with her story marking a shift of the movement's focus from the film industry to the music industry.

Life as a groupie
At the age of 13, Mattix began frequenting clubs on Sunset Strip with her friend Sable Starr, particularly the Rainbow Bar and Grill, the Whisky a Go Go, and Rodney Bingenheimer's English Disco.

Jimmy Page
In June 1972, while Led Zeppelin were in Los Angeles for their 1972 North American tour, the 13-year-old Mattix began a relationship with Led Zeppelin guitarist Jimmy Page. Mattix claims the relationship began by her being "basically kidnapped" by Led Zeppelin's tour manager Richard Cole and brought to Page's hotel room. According to Rolling Stone, Page went to great lengths to keep the relationship a secret due to the possibility of being arrested for statutory rape. 

At the insistence of Led Zeppelin's manager, Peter Grant, Mattix was kept in a locked hotel room with a security guard at the door during the band's subsequent U.S. touring. Mattix did not travel with Led Zeppelin while they were on tour but she claimed Page stationed himself in Los Angeles and would frequently fly back there to see her between concerts in the band's private jet, The Starship, and whenever Page returned to England, Mattix says he called her every day. 

According to Mattix, after they had been together for a year, Page was willing to be seen in public with her and began bringing her to concerts. Their relationship lasted for more than two years, ending in 1975. Mattix claimed she ended the relationship when she was 16 years old after finding Page in bed with Bebe Buell. Buell gave an alternate version of these events, claiming that despite the fact that Mattix "had given herself exclusively to Jimmy (Page) from age 14 to 16," she was barred by Page's security from seeing him once he began dating Buell.

Lori Mattix is said by Led Zeppelin biographers to have been referenced by the band in the song "Sick Again", specifically with the lyrics:

However, Robert Plant has said that he wrote the song in general about the many underaged groupies with whom the band were acquainted on their 1973 US Tour, whom he felt sorry for.

David Bowie
Mattix says that when she was 14 years old, she was introduced to David Bowie while he was in Los Angeles on his Ziggy Stardust Tour in October 1972. When Bowie's tour returned to Los Angeles five months later, on the night before Bowie performed at the Long Beach Arena in March 1973, Mattix claimed, Bowie's bodyguard was sent to pick up her and Starr for a sexual encounter. According to Mattix, as she told to Thrillist in 2015, she and Starr met Bowie at the Rainbow Bar before the three went to Bowie's hotel suite and had sex: "...[Bowie] de-virginized me...That night I lost my virginity and had my first threesome." 

However, Starr gave a conflicting account of the same night's events, claiming that she alone had sex with Bowie and that Mattix was no longer with them by the time they were at the hotel. Mattix also gave a different account of her encounter with Bowie to music journalist Paul Trynka, in which she claimed that she and Starr sought out the hotel room Bowie was staying in and snuck inside, uninvited. In this account, Mattix claimed that when they found Bowie he was "tired" but they initiated a sexual encounter with him. Mattix claims she continued to see Bowie "many times" in the ten years afterwards.

Mattix's allegations regarding her experience with Bowie have been called into question due to timeline issues; she may have already been in a relationship with Led Zeppelin guitarist Jimmy Page by the time she claims to have first met Bowie, as Led Zeppelin's 1972 North American tour came to Los Angeles in June, several months before Bowie's Ziggy Stardust Tour arrived for the first time in October 1972. Mattix's account is contradicted by fellow groupie Pamela Des Barres' 1987 memoir I'm with the Band: Confessions of a Groupie, in which Des Barres recalled Page being in an relationship with the then 13-year-old Mattix by late 1972 and before February 1973, therefore before March 1973 when Mattix claimed to have lost her virginity to Bowie. Mattix also previously claimed that she had lost her virginity to Page. Furthermore, unlike the numerous photos of Page and Mattix together, and the "heavily corroborated and well-documented evidence of their relationship", no photographic evidence of Bowie and Mattix together exists. 

A confirmed factual error in Mattix's account of her experience with Bowie is that although she claims to have met John Lennon and Yoko Ono with Bowie at the Rainbow Bar during the alleged encounter in March 1973, Bowie and Lennon never actually met until September 1974.

Mick Jagger
Mattix alleges to have engaged in a physically intimate relationship with Mick Jagger when she was 17, whom she claimed to have met in 1975 at a recording session featuring John Lennon, Paul McCartney, and Ringo Starr, but the claim has since been disputed since the only recording session with Lennon and McCartney after the dissolution of The Beatles took place in 1974 and there is no evidence that Mick Jagger was present at that session.

Other celebrities
She has also claimed to have had affairs with Jeff Beck, Ronnie Wood, T. Rex's Mickey Finn, Angela Bowie, Keith Emerson, Carl Palmer and Jimmy Bain.

Cultural impact
In 2015, an interview with Mattix was published in which she detailed the alleged relationships between her and Bowie, and later Page. The issue later became a central debate topic across social media, prompting a widespread review of how such stories should be understood in the #MeToo era.

When asked whether the Me Too movement had changed her opinion on her groupie years, Mattix admitted that she had not seen her relationships as exploitative at the time, but that the movement had forced her to view these years in a different light, and that now: 

Commentators have used Mattix's story to highlight the differences between social attitudes in the 1970s regarding the sexual exploitation of minors, particularly regarding people in positions of power, compared to more modern social values. Rebecca Hains, a children's media culture expert, viewed the problem as a symptom of sexism in the music industry, arguing that it is a "sad commentary on our culture that modern masculinity can be so entitled, so toxic, that we are repeatedly put in the position of both loving the art and hating the man behind said art for what he did to women and/or children." Journalist Stereo Williams framed the problem of lax social attention to such crimes as one endemic to the time period – considered unworthy of concern in the 1970s and earlier – but incompatible in a modern era where society has a greater focus on "protecting victims and holding celebrities accountable."

References

1958 births
Rape in the United States
Living people
Groupies
People from Los Angeles